Steve Levantis (July 28, 1916 – February 27, 1993) was a Canadian professional football player who played for the Toronto Argonauts and Hamilton Tiger-Cats. He won the Grey Cup with the Argonauts in 1945, 1946 and 1947. During World War II, Levantis enlisted and won a Grey Cup with the St. Hyacinthe–Donnacona Navy in 1944. His brother John Levantis also played professional football.

References

External links
Just Sports Stats

1916 births
1993 deaths
Canadian football people from Montreal
Players of Canadian football from Quebec
American football guards
Canadian football guards
Boston College Eagles football players
Toronto Argonauts players
Hamilton Tiger-Cats players
Canadian players of American football
Gridiron football people from Quebec